K.P. Munusamy (முனுசாமி; born 7 June 1952) is an Indian politician and deputy general secretary of AIADMK and incumbent member of the Tamil Nadu Legislative Assembly from Krishnagiri Constituency. Munusamy completed his Bachelor of Arts from Govt. Arts College, Krishnagiri during 1971-1974 and later graduated Bachelor of Law from Government Law College, Chennai. He was a Minister for Municipal Administration and Rural Development in the Government of Tamil Nadu.

Munusamy also serves as district Secretary, All India Anna Dravida Munnetra Kazhagam (AIADMK) and secretary of Krishnagiri district Anna employees union.

Political career 
He joined the Anna Dravida Munnetra Kazhagam party in the year 1972. He rose to the position of Head of the District Youth wing in the party by 1988. He contested in the 1991 Tamil Nadu state assembly elections where he emerged successful from Kaveripattinam constituency. Later he was elected to the 12th Lok Sabha from Krishnagiri Constituency. During his tenure as Member of Parliament, he was a member in various parliamentary committees including Committee on Agriculture, Committee to review the rate of dividend payable by the Railway Undertakings to General Revenues, Consultative Committee of Ministry of Science and Technology and other Science Departments. Then he emerged victorious in the 2001 Tamil Nadu state assembly elections from the same Kaveripattinam constituency. From January 2011, he is serving as the Krishnagiri District secretary for the Anna Dravida Munnetra Kazhagam party.

In the recent 2011 Tamil Nadu assembly elections, he was able to gain 89,776 votes against his rival Syed Ghiyas-Ul-Haq of Indian National Congress from Krishnagiri Constituency winning by a margin of 29,097 votes.

Electoral performance

References 

All India Anna Dravida Munnetra Kazhagam politicians
Living people
1952 births
State cabinet ministers of Tamil Nadu
India MPs 1998–1999
Lok Sabha members from Tamil Nadu
People from Krishnagiri district
Tamil Nadu MLAs 1991–1996
Tamil Nadu MLAs 2021–2026
Tamil Nadu MLAs 2011–2016